The Icelandic Shooting Sports Federation (Skotíþróttasamband Íslands) is an organization on Iceland for sport shooting with pistol, rifle and shotgun. The federation was founded on 1979 February 16, and is internationally affiliated with the International Shooting Sport Federation (ISSF), European Shooting Confederation (ESC), Nordic Shooting Region (NSR) and World Benchrest Shooting Federation (WBSF).

See also 
 Norwegian Shooting Association
 Finnish Shooting Sport Federation
 Swedish Shooting Sport Federation

References 

Organizations established in 1979
Shooting sports organizations
National members of the European Shooting Confederation